Carlos Jaime Alazraqui (born July 20, 1962) is an American actor, stand-up comedian, voice actor, singer, impressionist, producer, and screenwriter. He is best known for his role as Deputy James Garcia on Reno 911! and for his voice acting roles. His extensive voice-over work includes the original voice of Spyro from Spyro the Dragon, Shamless O’Scanty, Leslie P. Lilylegs, Elliott Sampson and Tad Tucker on New Looney Tunes, the Taco Bell chihuahua in the Taco Bell commercials, Denzel Crocker, Juandissimo Magnifico, and Sheldon Dinkleberg on The Fairly OddParents, Rocko and Spunky on Rocko's Modern Life, Scooter on SpongeBob SquarePants, Lazlo, Clam, and other characters on Camp Lazlo, Rikochet in ¡Mucha Lucha!, Grandpapi Rivera in El Tigre: The Adventures of Manny Rivera, Carlos Casagrande, Sergio, Vito, and other characters on The Casagrandes, and Mr. Weed in Family Guy. He is a weekly contributor on The Stephanie Miller Show.

Early life
Carlos Jaime Alazraqui was born in Yonkers, New York on July 20, 1962, to Argentine parents. He has Sephardic Jewish heritage from his father. He moved with his family to Concord, California, at an early age. Alazraqui graduated from Concord High School. He attended college at California State University, Sacramento from 1982 to 1986, where he began competing in open mic contests. After winning in his fourth year, Alazraqui took his prize money and moved to Los Angeles.

Career

Stand-up comedy
Alazraqui originally began his career in stand-up comedy, he was the winner of the San Francisco Comedy Competition in 1993. He beat out fellow comedians Marc Maron and Patton Oswalt.

In addition, Alazraqui joined Miller's Sexy Liberal Comedy Tour in 2014, playing some of the dates with Ward and he has a semi-regular segment on Miller's radio show Coffee with Carlos.

Film and television
Alazraqui is known for his live-action work in Reno 911!, in which he portrayed Deputy James Garcia for five seasons (2003–08). He played the same role in the series' 2007 spinoff film Reno 911! Miami. As a nod to this role, he also played a "bumbling" Reno cop in the CSI: Crime Scene Investigation episode "Let it Bleed". He has been a celebrity on the Tom Bergeron version of Hollywood Squares.

Alazraqui also wrote and starred in The Last White Dishwasher, a short film.

In 2020, Alazraqui reprised his role as Deputy James Oswaldo Garcia in the seventh season of Reno 911! which aired on Quibi. He also appeared in the 2021 Paramount+ movie, Reno 911! The Hunt for QAnon. The eighth season of the series, now titled Reno 911! Defunded, premiered on The Roku Channel in February 2022.

Voice acting
Alazraqui has performed several voices for Nickelodeon cartoons, including Rocko on Rocko's Modern Life, as well as Denzel Crocker and Juandissimo Magnifico on The Fairly OddParents, Winslow T. Oddfellow and Lube on CatDog, and Scooter on SpongeBob SquarePants. He also voiced several additional voices for the Cartoon Network shows, Cow and Chicken, Kidscity: The Village Dome of Kids, and I Am Weasel during their runs in the mid-late 1990s. He also voiced Spyro in Spyro the Dragon. He was later replaced by Tom Kenny as Spyro in Spyro 2: Ripto's Rage!, Spyro: Year of the Dragon and Spyro: Enter the Dragonfly. In 1997, he voiced Crash Bandicoot in a promotional ad for the game Crash Bandicoot 2: Cortex Strikes Back. He also voiced the Taco Bell chihuahua in the Taco Bell commercials, Rikochet in the first two seasons of ¡Mucha Lucha! and Mr. Weed (the head of the "Happy Go Lucky" toy factory) on Family Guy. It is mentioned in the DVD commentary track that Alazraqui was reluctant to leave Family Guy. In particular, Seth MacFarlane suggests that the death of Alazraqui's character took the actor by surprise. He also voiced Dr. Julius No in GoldenEye: Rogue Agent.

In 2005, he added the voices for two Cartoon Network series: The Life and Times of Juniper Lee where he played Monroe, a guardian dog with a Scottish accent and three characters in Camp Lazlo: Lazlo, Clam and Chef McMuesli. In 2006, he added Salty Mike from Squirrel Boy and Walden in Wow! Wow! Wubbzy! on Nick Jr. to his credits. He played Wisk in Glen Hill's 2000 film version of L. Frank Baum's The Life and Adventures of Santa Claus. He also provided the voice of Nestor in the Happy Feet films. And he currently voices Baba Looey, Mudsy the Funky Phantom and Loopy De Loop.

Jeff "Swampy" Marsh, a storyboard writer for Rocko's Modern Life, described Alazraqui's normal voice as bearing "no accent at all". Marsh describes Alazraqui's "Scottish accent" as "one of the best" and that he performs his other accents as "all very well". According to Marsh, Alazraqui uses various accents in his comedy routines. He had worked for the Disney Channel on Handy Manny, where he provided the voice for Felipe, the bilingual Phillips-head screwdriver and for Abuelito, Manny's grandfather. He was the original "voice guy" on the Stephanie Miller Show. His replacement was Jim Ward having previously substituted for him. In January 2008, Alazraqui returned to fill in briefly while Ward recovered from surgery. In 2014, he voiced Mesmo and Torts in Mixels. He voices Tio Tortuga in Sheriff Callie's Wild West.

He reprises his role as Denzel Crocker in live-action in The Fairly OddParents: Fairly Odder, which premiered on Paramount+ in March 2022.

Web
In 2009, he collaborated with Ted Nicolaou on the web series The Club, which was released in November 2010. The series features Jill-Michele Meleán, Debra Wilson, Johnny A. Sanchez, Lori Alan, and Daran Norris.

In 2013, Alazraqui starred as a drug dealer in one episode of the Melinda Hill web series Romantic Encounters.

Personal life
Alazraqui resides in Los Angeles, California, with his wife and two daughters. One daughter, Rylee, is a voice actor as well. Rylee is the voice of Rohk-Tahk in the Paramount+ series Star Trek: Prodigy.

Filmography

Awards and nominations
 2011 – Annie Award for Best Voice Acting in a Television Production – Nominated

References

External links

 
 
 
 
 

1962 births
Living people
American impressionists (entertainers)
American male comedians
American male film actors
American male television actors
American male video game actors
American male voice actors
American people of Argentine-Jewish descent
American people of Sephardic-Jewish descent
American stand-up comedians
Annie Award winners
California State University, Sacramento alumni
Cartoon Network people
Comedians from Los Angeles County
Comedians from New York (state)
Hispanic and Latino American male actors
Male actors from California
Male actors from New York (state)
People from Concord, California
People from Yonkers, New York
20th-century American comedians
21st-century American comedians